Jače manijače (Harder You Maniac) is maxi single of Croatian funk singer Dino Dvornik. Single also contains instrumental version of song. Song later became an ultimate hit. It was released in July 1990 on 12 inch vinyl by Jugoton.

Background 
Dvornik met his Montenegrin colleague Rambo Amadeus during recording of song Glupi hit (Stupid hit) from album Hoćemo gusle in 1989. As the result of that friendship, Amadeus wrote the lyrics for song.

Composition 

The song is in the style of funk and dance music that was in development in the former Yugoslavia. It was written in D Major with tempo of 120 bpm.

Music video 
Video was filmed in Zagreb and its surrounding. It was officially premiered on third channel of HTV in TV show DJ is so hot. Video was directed by Dinko Cepak and Tomislav Hleb. It was first Croatian music video to be aired on MTV.

Legacy 
Serbian band Zemlja gruva covered this song with permission Dvornik's wife Danijela. Their version is firstly performed in 2011 and 2 years later recorded studio version.

Personnel 
 Keyboards: Zoran Šabijan
 Saxophone: Mladen Baučić

References 

1990 songs
1990 singles
Jugoton singles